Tenco may refer to:

Tenço, alternative way of writing Tenso, a style of troubadour song
Luigi Tenco (1938–1967), Italian singer songwriter